This list of tallest buildings in Indiana ranks skyscrapers in the state of Indiana, United States of America by height. The second-tallest building in the state is the OneAmerica Tower, also in Indianapolis, which rises .

Tallest buildings
This list ranks Indiana buildings that stand at least 268 feet (82 m) tall, based on standard height measurement. This includes spires and architectural details but does not provide antenna masts or other objects not part of the original plans. Existing structures are included for ranking purposes based on present height.

See also
List of tallest buildings in Indianapolis
List of tallest buildings in the United States
List of tallest buildings by U.S. state

References

Tallest
Indiana